North American area code 956 is a state of Texas telephone area code for numbers in the Brownsville, McAllen, Laredo and South Padre Island areas.  It was created May 25, 1997, in a split from area code 210.

Counties served by this area code:
Cameron, Hidalgo, Jim Hogg, La Salle, Starr, Webb, Willacy, and Zapata

Towns and cities served by this area code: 
Alamo, Brownsville, Combes, Delmita, Donna, Edcouch, Edinburg, Elsa, Encinal, Falcon Heights, Garciasville, Grulla, Guerra, Hargill, Harlingen, Hidalgo, La Blanca, La Feria, La Joya, La Villa, Laredo, Lasara, Linn, Lopeño, Los Ebanos, Los Fresnos, Los Indios, Lozano, Lyford, McAllen, Mercedes, Mission, Olmito, Peñitas, Pharr, Port Isabel, Port Mansfield, Progreso, Raymondville, Rio Grande City, Rio Hondo, Roma, Salineno, San Benito, San Isidro, San Juan, San Perlita, San Ygnacio, Santa Elena, Santa Maria, Santa Rosa, Sebastian, South Padre Island, Sullivan City, Weslaco, and Zapata

See also
List of Texas area codes

External links
 List of exchanges from AreaCodeDownload.com, 956 Area Code

956
956
Cameron County, Texas
Webb County, Texas
Laredo, Texas